Meenakshi is a Hindu goddess, sometimes considered an avatar of the goddess Parvati.

Meenakshi may also refer to:

People
Meenakshi (name), an Indian given name, including a list of people with the name
Meenakshi (actress), Pinky Sarkar (born 1982), Indian actress in Tamil, Telugu, and Malayalam language films
Meenakshi (Malayalam actress), Maria Margaret Sharmilee (born 1985), Indian actress in Malayalam films
Meenakshi (Nayak queen) (1700-1736), queen of the Madurai Nayak Kingdom, ruled in 1731–1736

Other uses
Meenakshi College for Women, Chennai, Tamil Nadu, India
Meenakshi Power Plant Nellore, Andhra Pradesh India
Meenakshi Temple, Madurai, Tamil Nadu, India
Meenakshi World School, Gurgaon, Haryana, India
Meenakshi TV, an Indian Tamil-language television channel